The Mày language is an small Chuet language spoken in Minh Hóa district, Quảng Bình province, Central Vietnam by the May. It is a member of the Chuet languages, a Southeast Vietic subgroup of the Austroasiatic family.

The basic word order of May is SVO. May lexicons are made up of unstressed components that give the language original Austroasiatic characteristics that could be described as sequisyllabic. The language’s singularities include the initiating existence of coda -ɽ that derived proto-Vietic *-s, which stands behind a consonant nucleus. Compared to dominantly -l/-h/-i̯ of many other Vietic languages. Along with other distinctive features, May is considered a conservative Vietic language. 

The May language has not been properly studied and deconstructed. One problem with the language is that the May are willing to speak other languages rather than their own. With the expansion of the Vietnamese language as the national lingua franca of Vietnam and ignorance on indigenous languages, the impact of Vietnamese on May and globalization put the language in an essential endangered position. A syntax of May was cataloged by preeminent scholars Kirill Babaev and Irina Samarina in their 2018 Russian monograph, after the 2013 Russian–Vietnamese Linguistic Expedition to Quảng Bình with the help of Dr. Ta Van Thong and Dr. Le Van Truong, along with translation of databases made by Alexander Yefimov and Paul Sidwell.

Notes

Languages of Laos
Vietic languages
Languages of Vietnam
Endangered Austroasiatic languages